China Housing and Land Development Inc. is a Xi'an-based company that, through its subsidiaries, is engaged in the acquisition, development, management, and sale of commercial and residential real estate properties in the People's Republic of China.

It is the third-ranked housing and land development company in the Shaanxi province and ranked as the number one private housing and land development company in Xian.

Notable projects

Tsining 24G
Located at 133 Changle Road, Xi'an, it consists in the redevelopment of a pre-existing building near the commercial belt of the city. It comprises approximately  available for residential use, plus approx.  for commercial use. It was completed in June 2006.

Tsining Junjing Garden I
Consists of a European style community located at 369 North Jinhua Road, Xi'an.
It comprises 15 apartment buildings for a total of 1230 apartments.  of additional property have been used for commercial businesses.
The project was completed in September 2006.

Tsining Junjing Garden II
Built at 38 East Hujiamiao, Xian, the complex stretches through  of land.
The residential area consist of 2,119 one to five bedroom apartments.

References

External links

www.chldinc.com

Construction and civil engineering companies of China
Companies formerly listed on the Nasdaq
Chinese companies established in 1992
Construction and civil engineering companies established in 1992
Companies based in Xi'an